Varicose veins, also known as varicoses, are a medical condition in which superficial veins become enlarged and twisted. These veins typically develop in the legs, just under the skin. Varicose veins usually cause few symptoms. However, some individuals may experience fatigue or pain in the area. Complications can include bleeding or superficial thrombophlebitis. Varices in the scrotum are known as a varicocele, while those around the anus are known as hemorrhoids. Due to the various physical, social, and psychological effects of varicose veins, they can negatively affect one's quality of life.

Varicose veins have no specific cause. Risk factors include obesity, lack of exercise, leg trauma, and family history of the condition. They also develop more commonly during pregnancy. Occasionally they result from chronic venous insufficiency. Underlying causes include weak or damaged valves in the veins. They are typically diagnosed by examination, including observation by ultrasound.

By contrast, spider veins affect the capillaries and are smaller.

Treatment may involve lifestyle changes or medical procedures with the goal of improving symptoms and appearance. Lifestyle changes may include wearing compression stockings, exercising, elevating the legs, and weight loss. Possible medical procedures include sclerotherapy, laser surgery, and vein stripping. Reoccurrence is common following treatment.

Varicose veins are very common, affecting about 30% of people at some time in their lives. They become more common with age. Women develop varicose veins about twice as often as men. Varicose veins have been described throughout history and have been treated with surgery since at least A.D. 400.

Signs and symptoms 

 Aching, heavy legs
 Appearance of spider veins (telangiectasia) in the affected leg
 Ankle swelling
 A brownish-yellow shiny skin discoloration near the affected veins
 Redness, dryness, and itchiness of areas of skin, termed stasis dermatitis or venous eczema
 Muscle cramps when making sudden movements, such as standing
 Abnormal bleeding or healing time for injuries in the affected area
 Lipodermatosclerosis or shrinking skin near the ankles
 Restless legs syndrome appears to be a common overlapping clinical syndrome in people with varicose veins and other chronic venous insufficiency
 Atrophie blanche, or white, scar-like formations
 Burning or throbbing sensation in the legs
People with varicose veins might have a positive D-dimer blood test result due to chronic low-level thrombosis within dilated veins (varices).

Complications 
Most varicose veins are reasonably benign, but severe varicosities can lead to major complications, due to the poor circulation through the affected limb.
 Pain, tenderness, heaviness, inability to walk or stand for long hours
 Skin conditions / dermatitis which could predispose skin loss
 Skin ulcers especially near the ankle, usually referred to as venous ulcers
 Development of carcinoma or sarcoma in longstanding venous ulcers. Over 100 reported cases of malignant transformation have been reported at a rate reported as 0.4% to 1%
 Severe bleeding from minor trauma, of particular concern in the elderly
 Blood clotting within affected veins, termed superficial thrombophlebitis. These are frequently isolated to the superficial veins, but can extend into deep veins, becoming a more serious problem.
 Acute fat necrosis can occur, especially at the ankle of overweight people with varicose veins. Females have a higher tendency of being affected than males

Causes 

Varicose veins are more common in women than in men and are linked with heredity. Other related factors are pregnancy, obesity, menopause, aging, prolonged standing, leg injury and abdominal straining. Varicose veins are unlikely to be caused by crossing the legs or ankles. Less commonly, but not exceptionally, varicose veins can be due to other causes, such as post-phlebitic obstruction or incontinence, venous and arteriovenous malformations.

Venous reflux is a significant cause. Research has also shown the importance of pelvic vein reflux (PVR) in the development of varicose veins. Varicose veins in the legs could be due to ovarian vein reflux. Both ovarian and internal iliac vein reflux causes leg varicose veins. This condition affects 14% of women with varicose veins or 20% of women who have had vaginal delivery and have leg varicose veins. In addition, evidence suggests that failing to look for and treat pelvic vein reflux can be a cause of recurrent varicose veins.

There is increasing evidence for the role of incompetent perforator veins (or "perforators") in the formation of varicose veins. and recurrent varicose veins.

Varicose veins could also be caused by hyperhomocysteinemia in the body, which can degrade and inhibit the formation of the three main structural components of the artery: collagen, elastin and the proteoglycans. Homocysteine permanently degrades cysteine disulfide bridges and lysine amino acid residues in proteins, gradually affecting function and structure. Simply put, homocysteine is a 'corrosive' of long-living proteins, i.e. collagen or elastin, or lifelong proteins, i.e. fibrillin. These long-term effects are difficult to establish in clinical trials focusing on groups with existing artery decline. Klippel–Trenaunay syndrome and Parkes Weber syndrome are relevant for differential diagnosis.

Another cause is chronic alcohol consumption due to the vasodilatation side effect in relation to gravity and blood viscosity.

Management

Clinical test 
Clinical tests that may be used include:
 Trendelenburg test–to determine the site of venous reflux and the nature of the saphenofemoral junction

Investigations 

Traditionally, varicose veins were investigated using imaging techniques only if there was a suspicion of deep venous insufficiency, if they were recurrent, or if they involved the saphenopopliteal junction. This practice is now less widely accepted. People with varicose veins should now be investigated using lower limbs venous ultrasonography. The results from a randomised controlled trial on patients with and without routine ultrasound have shown a significant difference in recurrence rate and reoperation rate at 2 and 7 years of follow-up.

Stages 
The CEAP (Clinical, Etiological, Anatomical, and Pathophysiological) Classification, developed in 1994 by an international ad hoc committee of the American Venous Forum, outlines these stages

 C0 – no visible or palpable signs of venous disease
 C1 – telangectasia or reticular veins
 C2 – varicose veins
 C2r - recurrent varicose veins
 C3 – edema
 C4- changes in skin and subcutaneous tissue due to Chronic Venous Disease
 C4a – pigmentation or eczema
 C4b – lipodermatosclerosis or atrophie blanche
 C4c- Corona phlebectatica
 C5 – healed venous ulcer
 C6 – active venous ulcer
 C6r- recurrent active ulcer

Each clinical class is further characterized by a subscript depending upon whether the patient is symptomatic (S) or asymptomatic (A), e.g. C2S.

Treatment 
Treatment can be either active or conservative.

Active 
Treatment options include surgery, laser and  radiofrequency ablation, and ultrasound-guided foam sclerotherapy. Newer treatments include cyanoacrylate glue, mechanochemical ablation, and endovenous steam ablation. No real difference could be found between the treatments, except that radiofrequency ablation could have a better long-term benefit.

Conservative 
The National Institute for Health and Clinical Excellence (NICE) produced clinical guidelines in July 2013 recommending that all people with symptomatic varicose veins (C2S) and worse should be referred to a vascular service for treatment. Conservative treatments such as support stockings should not be used unless treatment was not possible.

The symptoms of varicose veins can be controlled to an extent with the following:
 Elevating the legs often provides temporary symptomatic relief.
 Advice about regular exercise sounds sensible but is not supported by any evidence.
 The wearing of graduated compression stockings with variable pressure gradients (Class II or III) has been shown to correct the swelling, nutritional exchange, and improve the microcirculation in legs affected by varicose veins. They also often provide relief from the discomfort associated with this disease. Caution should be exercised in their use in patients with concurrent peripheral arterial disease.
 The wearing of intermittent pneumatic compression devices have been shown to reduce swelling and pain.
 Diosmin/hesperidin and other flavonoids.
 Anti-inflammatory medication such as ibuprofen or aspirin can be used as part of treatment for superficial thrombophlebitis along with graduated compression hosiery – but there is a risk of intestinal bleeding. In extensive superficial thrombophlebitis, consideration should be given to anti-coagulation, thrombectomy, or sclerotherapy of the involved vein.
 Topical gel application helps in managing symptoms related to varicose veins such as inflammation, pain, swelling, itching, and dryness.

Procedures

Stripping 
Stripping consists of removal of all or part the saphenous vein (great/long or lesser/short) main trunk. The complications include deep vein thrombosis (5.3%), pulmonary embolism (0.06%), and wound complications including infection (2.2%). There is evidence for the great saphenous vein regrowing after stripping. For traditional surgery, reported recurrence rates, which have been tracked for 10 years, range from 5% to 60%. In addition, since stripping removes the saphenous main trunks, they are no longer available for use as venous bypass grafts in the future (coronary or leg artery vital disease).

Other 
Other surgical treatments are:
 CHIVA method (ambulatory conservative haemodynamic correction of venous insufficiency) is a relatively low-invasive surgical technique that incorporates venous hemodynamics and preserves the superficial venous system. The overall effectiveness compared to stripping, radiofrequency ablation treatment, or endovenous laser therapy is not clear and there is no strong evidence to suggest that CHIVA is superior to stripping, radiofrequency ablation, or endovenous laser therapy for recurrence of varicose veins. There is some low-certainty evidence that CHIVA may result in more bruising compared to radiofrequency ablation treatment.
 Ambulatory phlebectomy.
 Vein ligation is done at the saphenofemoral junction after ligating the tributaries at the sephanofemoral junction without stripping the long saphenous vein provided the perforator veins are competent and absent DVT in the deep veins. With this method, the long saphenous vein is preserved.
 Cryosurgery- A cryoprobe is passed down the long saphenous vein following saphenofemoral ligation. Then the probe is cooled with NO2 or CO2 to −85o F. The vein freezes to the probe and can be retrogradely stripped after 5 seconds of freezing. It is a variant of Stripping. The only point of this technique is to avoid a distal incision to remove the stripper.

Sclerotherapy 
A commonly performed non-surgical treatment for varicose and "spider leg veins" is sclerotherapy, in which medicine called a sclerosant is injected into the veins to make them shrink. The medicines that are commonly used as sclerosants are polidocanol (POL branded Asclera in the United States, Aethoxysklerol in Australia), sodium tetradecyl sulphate (STS), Sclerodex (Canada), Hypertonic Saline, Glycerin and Chromated Glycerin. STS (branded Fibrovein in Australia) liquids can be mixed at varying concentrations of sclerosant and varying sclerosant/gas proportions, with air or CO2 or O2 to create foams. Foams may allow more veins to be treated per session with comparable efficacy. Their use in contrast to liquid sclerosant is still somewhat controversial  and there is no clear evidence that foam are superior. Sclerotherapy has been used in the treatment of varicose veins for over 150 years. Sclerotherapy is often used for telangiectasias (spider veins) and varicose veins that persist or recur after vein stripping. Sclerotherapy can also be performed using foamed sclerosants under ultrasound guidance to treat larger varicose veins, including the great saphenous and small saphenous veins.

There is some evidence that sclerotherapy is a safe and may be an effective treatment option for improving the cosmetic appearance, reducing residual varicose veins, improving the quality of life, and reducing symptoms that may be present due to the varicose veins. There is also weak evidence that this treatment option may have a slightly higher risk of deep vein thrombosis. It is not known if sclerotherapy decreases the chance that varicose veins return (recurrent varicose veins). It is also not known if the type of liquid, substance, or foam used for the sclerotherapy procedure is the most effective and comes with the lowest risk of complications.

Complications of sclerotherapy are rare but can include blood clots and ulceration. Anaphylactic reactions are "extraordinarily rare but can be life-threatening," and doctors should have resuscitation equipment ready. There has been one reported case of stroke after ultrasound-guided sclerotherapy when an unusually large dose of sclerosant foam was injected.

Endovenous thermal ablation 

There are three kinds of endovenous thermal ablation treatment possible: laser, radiofrequency, and steam.

The Australian Medical Services Advisory Committee (MSAC) in 2008 determined that endovenous laser treatment/ablation (ELA) for varicose veins "appears to be more effective in the short term, and at least as effective overall, as the comparative procedure of junction ligation and vein stripping for the treatment of varicose veins." It also found in its assessment of available literature, that "occurrence rates of more severe complications such as DVT, nerve injury, and paraesthesia, post-operative infections, and haematomas, appears to be greater after ligation and stripping than after EVLT". Complications for ELA include minor skin burns (0.4%) and temporary paresthesia (2.1%). The longest study of endovenous laser ablation is 39 months.

Two prospective randomized trials found speedier recovery and fewer complications after radiofrequency ablation (ERA) compared to open surgery. Myers wrote that open surgery for small saphenous vein reflux is obsolete. Myers said these veins should be treated with endovenous techniques, citing high recurrence rates after surgical management, and risk of nerve damage up to 15%. By comparison ERA has been shown to control 80% of cases of small saphenous vein reflux at 4 years, said Myers. Complications for ERA include burns, paraesthesia, clinical phlebitis and slightly higher rates of deep vein thrombosis (0.57%) and pulmonary embolism (0.17%). One 3-year study compared ERA, with a recurrence rate of 33%, to open surgery, which had a recurrence rate of 23%.

Steam treatment consists in injection of pulses of steam into the sick vein. This treatment which works with a natural agent (water) has similar results than laser or radiofrequency. The steam presents a lot of post-operative advantages for the patient (good aesthetic results, less pain, etc.)

ELA and ERA require specialized training for doctors and special equipment. ELA is performed as an outpatient procedure and does not require an operating theatre, nor does the patient need a general anaesthetic. Doctors use high-frequency ultrasound during the procedure to visualize the anatomical relationships between the saphenous structures.

Some practitioners also perform phlebectomy or ultrasound-guided sclerotherapy at the time of endovenous treatment. Follow-up treatment to smaller branch varicose veins is often needed in the weeks or months after the initial procedure. Steam is a very promising treatment for both doctors (easy introduction of catheters, efficient on recurrences, ambulatory procedure, easy and economic procedure) and patients (less post-operative pain, a natural agent, fast recovery to daily activities).

Medical Adhesive 
Also called medical super glue, medical adhesive is an advanced non-surgical treatment for varicose veins during which a solution is injected into the diseased vein through a small catheter and under the assistance of ultrasound-guided imagery. The "super glue" solution is made of cyanoacrylate, aiming at sealing the vein and rerouting the blood flow to other healthy veins.

Post-treatment, the body will naturally absorb the treated vein which will disappear. Involving only a small incision and no hospital stay, medical super glue has generated great interest within the last years, with a success rate of about 96.8%.

A follow-up consultation is required after this treatment, just like any other one, in order to re-assess the diseased vein and further treat it if needed.

Echotherapy Treatment 
In the field of varicose veins, the latest medical innovation is high-intensity focused ultrasound therapy (HIFU). This method is completely non-invasive and is not necessarily performed in an operating room, unlike existing techniques. This is because the procedure involves treating from outside the body, able to penetrate the skin without damage, to treat the veins in a targeted area. This leaves no scars and allows the patient to return to their daily life immediately.

Epidemiology
Varicose veins are most common after age 50. It is more prevalent in females. There is a hereditary role. It has been seen in smokers, those who have chronic constipation, and in people with occupations which necessitate long periods of standing such as wait staff, nurses, conductors (musical and bus), stage actors, umpires (cricket, javelin, etc.), the King's guards, lectern orators, security guards, traffic police officers, vendors, surgeons, etc.

References

External links 
 

Vascular surgery
Medical conditions related to obesity
Diseases of veins, lymphatic vessels and lymph nodes
External signs of ageing
Wikipedia medicine articles ready to translate